Lucien Dolquès (27 February 1905 – 17 July 1977) was a French long-distance runner. He competed in the men's 5000 metres at the 1924 Summer Olympics.

References

External links
 

1905 births
1977 deaths
Athletes (track and field) at the 1924 Summer Olympics
French male long-distance runners
Olympic athletes of France
Place of birth missing
Olympic cross country runners
20th-century French people